The discography of Camille O'Sullivan, an Irish musician, consists of two studio albums, four live albums, one extended play, one single, two video albums and two music videos.

Albums

Studio albums

Live albums

Extended plays

Singles

Video albums

Music videos

Miscellaneous appearances

References 

General reference

Discographies of Irish artists
Rock music discographies
Pop music discographies